Renaud Roussel is a French actor and model born on March 11, 1973.

Biography 

He has been recognized by the public for his role as Daniel in the latest episodes of Premiers Baisers (First Kiss) and in all episodes of Les Années fac (The College. Years). In parallel with his career as an actor, he is also a model for commercials (Auchan, Intermarché, Conforama, Renault, Vet'affaires). He also regularly poses for the private sales site "Brandalley". Recently, we have seen in Hollywood Girls: A new life in California or under the sun of Saint-Tropez. In 2013, he appears in an advertisement of Monalbumphoto.fr and interprets Antoine. In 2014, Renaud Roussel appears in season 8 of the series The Mysteries of Love.

After having participated in a bonus of Plus belle la vie in 2011 in which he played the role of a professional robber, Renaud Roussel returned to the cast at the end of 2015 to interpret the recurring role of Arnaud Mougin, the husband of the character played by Vanessa Valence.

As of September 2017, Renaud Roussel plays in Éric Delcourt's play La fève du samedi soir alongside Capucine Anav and Patrick Veisselier.

Filmography

Television 

 1994-1995 : Premiers Baisers - Daniel 
 1995-1997 : Les Années fac - Daniel  
 2006 : SOS 18 - Vincent 
 2008 : Flics - Pascal Etcheverry
 2009 : Claire Brunetti - Vincent Brunetti 
 2009 : R.I.S Police scientifique - Sébastien Daumont 
 2010 : Chante! - divers
 2010 : Sur le fil - Captain Duplan 
 2011 : Le juge est une femme - Adrien Garnier 
 2011 : Plus belle la vie - Sylvain Sinclair 
 2012 : Section de recherches  Eric Le Roux (Season 6, Episode 6)
 2012 : Hollywood Girls : Une nouvelle vie en Californie - Tony Angeli
 2013 : Sous le soleil de Saint-Tropez - Victor 
 2013 : Camping Paradis : Camping Circus - Marc (Season 5, Episode 2) 
 2014 : Les Mystères de l'amour - Daniel (Season 8) 
 2015 :  Commissaire Magellan - François Guérin
 2015-2016 : Plus belle la vie -  Arnaud Mougin (Season 12)
 2016 : Clem - Alex Giroin (Season 7)

Film 

 1998 : Le mystère: Joséphine
 1998 : Sucre amer: Captain Rougier
 2009 : R.T.T

Theatre 

 2017 : La fève du samedi soir d'Éric Delcourt

References

External links 

 Official Site
 

French male actors
French male models
1973 births
Living people